Armandinho (born Armando da Costa Macêdo, May 23, 1953) is a Brazilian composer and singer. He was born in Salvador, the son of Osmar Macêdo, from the world's first trio elétrico, the Trio Elétrico de Dodô e Osmar. (In the 1940s, at the same time the electric guitar was invented, Osmar Macêdo along with bandmate Adolfo Nascimento [who was an electrical engineer] independently created the Guitarra Baiana, a type of electric cavaquinho, which gave the Trio Elétrico its name.) In his early career, he played in his bands Trio Elétrico Mirim in 1962 and Hell's Angels in 1967.

In 1970, he formed A Cor do Som with bassist/vocalist Dadi, keyboardist/vocalist Mú Carvalho, percussionist/vocalist Ary Dias and drummer Gustavo Schroeter. They performed in Montreux Jazz Festival had some hits with "Beleza pura" (Caetano Veloso), "Abri a porta" (Gilberto Gil/Dominguinhos), "Zanzibar" (Armandinho/Fausto Nilo), etc.

Since then, Armandinho has recorded and performed with musicians such as Raphael Rabello, Paulo Moura, Época de Ouro, Moraes Moreira, Pepeu Gomes, as well as his own group, the Trio Elétrico de Armandinho.

Discography

Solo albums

 1983 - Armandinho e o Trio Elétrico de Dodô e Osmar
 1989 - Brasileirô (Movie Records)
 1993 - Instrumental no CBB - Época de Ouro e Armandinho
 1996 - Brasil Musical - Série Música Viva - Armandinho e Raphael Rabello
 1997 - O Melhor do Chorinho Ao Vivo - Armandinho e Época de Ouro
 1997 - Raphael Rabello e Armandinho - Em Concerto
 1999 - Retocando o Choro
 2001 - Caetano & Gil
 2003 - Retocando o Choro Ao Vivo (Biscoito Fino)
 2009 - Pop Choro
 2009 - Paulo Moura e Armandinho - Afrobossanova

References

1953 births
Living people
Brazilian male guitarists
Brazilian mandolinists
20th-century Brazilian male singers
20th-century Brazilian singers
People from Salvador, Bahia
Música Popular Brasileira singers
Música Popular Brasileira guitarists
Brazilian composers
Universal Music Group artists
21st-century Brazilian male singers
21st-century Brazilian singers